Squalius zrmanjae is a species of freshwater fish in the family Cyprinidae.
It is found only in Croatia.
Its natural habitat is rivers.
It is becoming rare due to habitat loss.

References

Squalius
Fish described in 1928
Taxa named by Stanko Karaman
Taxonomy articles created by Polbot